Conopomorpha zaplaca is a moth of the family Gracillariidae. It is known from New South Wales and Queensland, Australia.

References

Conopomorpha
Moths described in 1907